Lepidosira is a genus of slender springtails in the family Entomobryidae. There are at least 20 described species in Lepidosira.

Species
These 28 species belong to the genus Lepidosira:

 Lepidosira anomala Salmon, 1944 c g
 Lepidosira arborea c g
 Lepidosira bidentata Salmon, 1938 c g
 Lepidosira bifasciata (Salmon, 1944) c g
 Lepidosira bisecta (Salmon, 1944) c g
 Lepidosira flava c g
 Lepidosira fuchsiata (Salmon, 1938) c g
 Lepidosira fuscata Womersley, 1930 c g
 Lepidosira glebosa Salmon, 1941 c g
 Lepidosira ianthina (Salmon, 1941) c g
 Lepidosira inconstans (Salmon, 1938) c g
 Lepidosira indistincta Slmon, 1938 c g
 Lepidosira magna c g
 Lepidosira minima Salmon, 1938 c g
 Lepidosira minuta Salmon, 1938 c g
 Lepidosira nigrocephala (Womersley, 1934) g
 Lepidosira obscura (Salmon, 1944) c g
 Lepidosira okarita Salmon, 1938 c g
 Lepidosira omniofusca Slmon, 1941 c g
 Lepidosira parva (Salmon, 1941) c g
 Lepidosira punctata Yosii, 1960 g
 Lepidosira purpurea c g
 Lepidosira quadradentata (Salmon, 1941) c g
 Lepidosira rotorua Salmon, 1938 c g
 Lepidosira sagmaria (Schött, 1917) c g
 Lepidosira sexmacula Salmon, 1938 c g
 Lepidosira splendida (Salmon, 1941) c g
 Lepidosira terraereginae Ellis & Bellinger, 1973 c g

Data sources: i = ITIS, c = Catalogue of Life, g = GBIF, b = Bugguide.net

References

Further reading

 
 
 

Collembola